Amelogenesis imperfecta (AI) is a congenital disorder which presents with a rare abnormal formation of the enamel or external layer of the crown of teeth, unrelated to any systemic or generalized conditions. Enamel is composed mostly of mineral, that is formed and regulated by the proteins in it. Amelogenesis imperfecta is due to the malfunction of the proteins in the enamel (ameloblastin, enamelin, tuftelin and amelogenin) as a result of abnormal enamel formation via amelogenesis.

People with amelogenesis imperfecta may have teeth with abnormal color: yellow, brown or grey; this disorder can affect any number of teeth of both dentitions. Enamel hypoplasia manifests in a variety of ways depending on the type of AI an individual has (see below), with pitting and plane-form defects common. The teeth have a higher risk for dental cavities and are hypersensitive to temperature changes as well as rapid attrition, excessive calculus deposition, and gingival hyperplasia. The earliest known case of AI is in an extinct hominid species called Paranthropus robustus, with over a third of individuals displaying this condition.

Genetics
Multiple gene expression is needed for enamel formation, in which the relevant matrix proteins and proteinases are transcribed, for regular crystal growth and enamel mineralization.

Mutations in the AMELX, ENAM, MMP20, KLK-4, FAM83H, WDR72, C4orf26, SLC24A4 LAMB3 and ITGB6 genes have been found to cause amelogenesis imperfecta (non-syndromic form). AMELX and ENAM encode extracellular matrix proteins of the developing tooth enamel and KLK-4 and MMP20 encode proteases that help degrade organic matter from the enamel matrix during the maturation stage of amelogenesis.  SLC24A4 encodes a calcium transporter that mediates calcium transport to developing enamel during tooth development. Less is known about the function of other genes implicated in amelogenesis imperfecta.

Researchers expect that mutations in further genes are likely to be identified as causes of amelogenesis imperfecta. Types include:

Amelogenesis imperfecta can have different inheritance patterns depending on the gene that is altered. Mutations in the ENAM gene are the most frequent known cause and are most commonly inherited in an autosomal dominant pattern. This type of inheritance means one copy of the altered gene in each cell is sufficient to cause the disorder.

Amelogenesis imperfecta is also inherited in an autosomal recessive pattern; this form of the disorder can result from mutations in the ENAM, MMP20, KLK4, FAM20A, C4orf26 or SLC24A4 genes. Autosomal recessive inheritance means two copies of the gene in each cell are altered.

About 5% of amelogenesis imperfecta cases are caused by mutations in the AMELX gene and are inherited in an X-linked pattern. A condition is considered X-linked if the mutated gene that causes the disorder is located on the X chromosome, one of the two sex chromosomes. In most cases, males with an X-linked form of this condition experience more severe dental abnormalities than affected females. Recent genetic studies suggest that the cause of a significant proportion of amelogenesis imperfecta cases remains to be discovered.

Diagnosis
AI can be classified according to their clinical appearances:

Type 1 - Hypoplastic
Enamel of abnormal thickness due to malfunction in enamel matrix formation. Enamel is very thin but hard & translucent, and may have random pits & grooves. Condition is of autosomal dominant, autosomal recessive, or x-linked pattern. Enamel differs in appearance from dentine radiographically as normal functional enamel.
Type 2 - Hypomaturation
Enamel has sound thickness, with a pitted appearance. It is less hard compared to normal enamel, and are prone to rapid wear, although not as intense as Type 3 AI. Condition is of autosomal dominant, autosomal recessive, or x-linked pattern. Enamel appears to be comparable to dentine in its radiodensity on radiographs.
Type 3 - Hypocalcified
Enamel defect due to malfunction of enamel calcification, therefore enamel is of normal thickness but is extremely brittle, with an opaque/chalky presentation. Teeth are prone to staining and rapid wear, exposing dentine. Condition is of autosomal dominant and autosomal recessive pattern. Enamel appears less radioopaque compared to dentine on radiographs.
Type 4 - Hypomature hypoplastic enamel with taurodontism
 Enamel has a variation in appearance, with mixed features from Type 1 and Type 2 AI. All Type 4 AI has taurodontism in common. Condition is of autosomal dominant pattern. Other common features may include an anterior open bite, taurodontism, sensitivity of teeth.

Differential diagnosis would include dental fluorosis, molar-incisor hypomineralization, chronological disorders of tooth development.

Treatment

Preventive and restorative dental care is very important as well as considerations for esthetic issues since the crown are yellow from exposure of dentin due to enamel loss. The main objectives of treatment is pain relief, preserving patient's remaining dentition, and to treat and preserve the patient's occlusal vertical height.

Many factors are to be considered to decide on treatment options such as the classification and severity of AI, the patient's social history, clinical findings etc. There are many classifications of AI but the general management of this condition is similar.

Full-coverage crowns are sometimes being used to compensate for the abraded enamel in adults, tackling the sensitivity the patient experiences. Usually stainless steel crowns are used in children which may be replaced by porcelain once they reach adulthood.  These aid with maintaining occlusal vertical dimension.

Aesthetics may be addressed via placement of composite or porcelain veneers, depending on patient factors e.g. age. If the patient has primary or mixed dentition, lab-made composite veneers may be provided temporarily, to be replaced by permanent porcelain veneers once the patient has stabilized permanent dentition. The patient's oral hygiene and diet should be controlled as well as they play a factor in the success of retaining future restorations.

In the worst-case scenario, the teeth may have to be extracted and implants or dentures are required. Loss of nerves in the affected teeth may occur.

Epidemiology
The exact incidence of amelogenesis imperfecta is uncertain. Estimates vary widely, from 1 in 700 people in northern Sweden to 1 in 14,000 people in the United States. The prevalence of amelogenesis imperfecta in non-human animals has not been explored, however its presence has been noted.

This condition is neither caused by nor the equivalent of dental fluorosis. A manifestation of amelogenesis imperfecta known as "snow capping" is confined to the outer prismless enamel layer. It may superficially resemble dental fluorosis, and indeed "snow capping" may be used as a descriptive term in some incidents of dental fluorosis.

References

Further reading

External links 

Developmental tooth disorders
Genetic disorders by system